This is a list of radio stations located in the state of Querétaro, Mexico, which can be sorted by their call signs, frequencies, location, ownership, names, and programming formats.

References 

Querétaro